Rekha Arya is an Indian politician and current Cabinet Minister of Women and Child Welfare, Government of Uttarakhand and member of the Bharatiya Janata Party. She was elected MLA from Someshwar(SC) constituency in 2017 and 2022 elections.

References

Living people
Members of the Uttarakhand Legislative Assembly
Indian National Congress politicians
1978 births
Bharatiya Janata Party politicians from Uttarakhand
Uttarakhand MLAs 2017–2022
State cabinet ministers of Uttarakhand